Schrankia is a genus of moths of the family Erebidae. It was described by Jacob Hübner in 1825.

Taxonomy
The genus has previously been classified in the subfamily Hypenodinae of the family Noctuidae.

Species

 Schrankia altivolans (Butler, 1880)
 Schrankia aurantilineata (Hampson, 1896)
 Schrankia balneorum (Alphéraky, 1880)
 Schrankia bilineata Galsworthy, 1997
 Schrankia boisea Holloway, 1977
 Schrankia bruntoni Holloway, 2008
 Schrankia calligrapha Snellen, 1880
 Schrankia capnophanes (Turner, 1939)
 Schrankia cheesmanae Holloway, 1977
 Schrankia costaestrigalis Stephens, 1834 – pinion-streaked snout
 Schrankia croceipicta (Hampson, 1893)
 Schrankia daviesi Holloway, 1977
 Schrankia dimorpha Inoue, 1979
 Schrankia dochmographa D. S. Fletcher, 1957
 Schrankia dusunorum Holloway, 2008
 Schrankia erromanga Holloway, 1977
 Schrankia flualis (Schaus, 1916)
 Schrankia furoroa Robinson, 1975
 Schrankia howarthi D. Davis & Medeiros, 2009
 Schrankia intermedialis Reid, 1972
 Schrankia karkara Holloway, 1977
 Schrankia kogii Inoue, 1979
 Schrankia macula Druce, 1891 – black-spotted schrankia moth
 Schrankia masuii Inoue, 1979
 Schrankia microscopica (Berio, 1962)
 Schrankia musalis (Schaus, 1916)
 Schrankia namibiensis Hacker, 2004
 Schrankia nokowula Holloway, 1977
 Schrankia nouankaoa Holloway, 1977
 Schrankia obstructalis (Walker, [1866])
 Schrankia pelicano Pekarsky, 2012
 Schrankia scoparioides Hacker, 2004
 Schrankia seinoi Inoue, 1979
 Schrankia separatalis (Herz, 1904)
 Schrankia solitaria D. S. Fletcher, 1961
 Schrankia spiralaedeagus Holloway, 2008
 Schrankia tabwemasana Holloway, 1977
 Schrankia taenialis Hübner, [1809] – white-line snout moth
 Schrankia tamsi Holloway, 1977
 Schrankia taona (Tams, 1935)
 Schrankia vitiensis Robinson, 1975

References

 Hübner ([1809]). Sammlung Europäischer Schmetterlinge [6]: pl. 23 (1800-1809), fig. 151.
 
 Reid (1972). Entomologist's Gazette 23: 221, f. 1, fig. 4.
 
 Stephens (1834). Illustrations of British Entomology, (Haustellata) 4(2): 21.

Hypenodinae
Moth genera
Taxa named by Jacob Hübner